KQRS-FM (92.5 MHz, KQ92 or 92 KQRS) is a classic rock radio station in the Twin Cities region of Minnesota. The station is licensed to suburban Golden Valley, transmits from the KMSP-TV tower in Shoreview, and is owned by Cumulus Media, with studios in Southeast Minneapolis in the Como district.

History
The original call letters were KEVE-FM and the station was co-owned with sister AM station KEVE. KEVE's AM history predates the FM by 14 years; it launched in May 1948, and was owned by Family Broadcasting until mid-1956 and was known until at least then as KEYD, co-owned with KEYD-TV (now KMSP-TV and launched by Family Broadcasting in January 1955). The KEYD Radio studios were located in downtown Minneapolis on 9th Street off of Hennepin Avenue adjacent to the Orpheum Theatre. Calls were changed to KADM to complement its AM sister (as in "Adam and Eve") in October 1963. A gradual shift from country music to a mix of classical music, show tunes and adult standards began in 1960 and was completed on both stations by March 1963. On December 1, 1964, the call letters for both radio stations became KQRS. The KEVE studios had, by 1957, moved to its transmitter site in Golden Valley at 917 Lilac Drive, set back from Minnesota State Highway 100. This location was the first studio and transmitter site for the station.

The KQRS call sign stayed with the AM until 1982, when it switched to an oldies format as KGLD before returning to the simulcast and the KQRS calls less than two years later. In 1996, the AM was again split from the FM to become one of the first affiliates of Radio Disney, a format targeting children (see KDIZ). Both stations were owned by Disney at the time. In early 2001, KQRS and KDIZ (along with sister stations 93X and 105.1/105.3/105.7) moved their studios and offices to 2000 Elm Street SE in Minneapolis, near the University of Minnesota campus.

In the mid-1960s, KQRS programmed a Middle-of-the-Road format (MOR) with classical and big band music and Brazilian Bossa Nova music in evenings. In addition to this format, Joe Pyne's talk radio show was carried. In the summer of 1968, KQRS started experimenting with freeform rock in the late night hours with a program called "Nightwatch" with George Donaldson Fisher as DJ. This became very popular with college age listeners, and in a few months, the rock format was expanded to begin playing in the evenings as well with DJ Alan Stone, and was known as "Nightwatch Trip One", with Fisher's program renamed slightly as "Nightwatch Trip Two."  A few months later, this became the primary full-time format. 

By 1977, the freeform rock would give way to a tightly programmed rock approach, courtesy of radio consultants Burkhart/Abrams and their "Superstars" format, which was essentially just the hits from album rock. This approach continued into 1986, with respectable, if not spectacular ratings, when KQRS signed a new consultant, Jacobs Media, and evolved into its present-day classic rock format. That, coupled with its massively popular morning show, elevated KQRS to the top of the Minneapolis-St. Paul radio market ratings.

In 1994, KQRS had the distinction of unseating legendary area broadcaster WCCO (830 AM) as the most-listened-to station in the Minneapolis-St. Paul market (12+), an achievement which WCCO had held unchallenged for decades. The KQ92 Morning Show hosted by Tom Barnard was a major element in KQ's ascendance to the top spot, along with shifting market demographics.  Barnard and the KQ Morning Show also were successful in holding the top rating spot when Howard Stern made his debut on the Twin Cities airwaves in 1997. Stern lasted only until mid-1999 in Minneapolis as his ratings brought him to the number two position in morning drive time, but the station that carried the show, WRQC, had poor ratings during the rest of the day, leading to the dropping of Stern and a format change.

Rival KRXX, then known as "93X", was purchased by then-owners Capital Cities-ABC in the Spring of 1994, and the station's call sign was changed to KEGE with a new alternative rock format. It primarily competed with the growing "REV 105," though KQRS' parent company purchased the three REV signals in 1997. The stations went through several incarnations, including active rock, urban oldies and for the majority of the time, alternative rock, as well as Soft AC/oldies, adult contemporary, sports talk, and classic hip hop, before flipping back to Soft AC/oldies in late 2018 as Love 105.

With the three formats, Disney initially created what has been referred to in the industry as the "wall of rock". With the three formats covering different major rock genres, Disney dominated rock radio in the Twin Cities, and used 93X and Drive 105/Zone 105 as 'flankers' to ward off competitors trying to knock off KQRS, its station with the largest audience in the market and the company's local cash cow.

KQRS had been programmed by award-winning programming veteran (and former DJ) David Hamilton for over 25 years, until his retirement in December 2012. At that time, Cumulus appointed WZGC (Atlanta) Program Director Scott Jameson, who exited in January 2020. The KQRS airstaff is live and local 24 hours a day and has remained unusually consistent for years as well, with most staffers there for 10 years or more.  Tom Barnard had hosted the long-running morning show before retiring on December 23 2022. The KQ Morning show is now hosted by Steve Gorman (former drummer of the Black Crowes) Tony Lee, Brian Zepp and Candice Wheeler. Woody hosts middays 10am-3pm and Lisa Miller does the afternoon drive from 3pm-7pm. KQ's Weekend airstaff includes: Chris Nelson, James and Jordan.

In May 2005, KQRS began offering podcasts of the morning show through the station's website.

On June 1, 2007, Citadel Broadcasting closed on its purchase of ABC Radio, acquiring KQRS. KDIZ, the former KQRS 1440, was retained by Disney. Citadel merged with Cumulus Media on September 16, 2011.

KQRS-HD2
KQRS began broadcasting an HD signal in 2007, with an HD simulcast of the station's main analog signal. The station ran a classic country format branded as "The Bear" on its HD2 signal, but was taken off air December 31, 2014 alongside the HD simulcast of the analog on HD1. The HD simulcast of the KQRS analog signal in digital returned full-time on December 31, 2016 at 9:30pm. "The Bear" returned to KQRS-HD2 on June 27, 2018 offering a format of classic country and solid gold country hits from the early 60s into the early-mid 2000's. In January 2023 both KQRS-HD1 and The Bear were removed, until March 2023 when KQRS-HD1 returned to the air, however HD2 has not returned.

Pop culture
In the 1996 Christmas-themed movie Jingle All the Way, the character played by Arnold Schwarzenegger calls KQRS during a contest in an effort to win a rare toy doll for his child.  He gets through and answers the question correctly but finds out that he only won a gift certificate. The film is set in and was shot in the Twin Cities.

References

 
 
 
 
 
 
 Historical reference to KEYD-AM and TV, Pavek Museum Of Broadcasting
 Broadcasting Yearbooks 1948-1964
 Internet Archive February 2, 2001 showing new station address

External links
KQRS official website
KQRS Streaming Audio
Radiotapes.com Historic Minneapolis/St. Paul airchecks dating back to 1924 including airchecks of KQRS and other Twin Cities radio stations
Rick Burnett's TwinCitiesRadioAirchecks.com Photos and historical recordings of KQ and other Twin Cities radio stations
KEYD-AM exterior photo, 1953, from The Minnesota Historical Society

Radio stations in Minneapolis–Saint Paul
HD Radio stations
Cumulus Media radio stations
Classic rock radio stations in the United States
Radio stations established in 1962
Former subsidiaries of The Walt Disney Company